The Battle for the Brice–Cowell Musket is the rivalry between the Maine Black Bears and the New Hampshire Wildcats. Both schools are members of the Colonial Athletic Association (CAA). Through the 2022 season, the two teams have met 112 times on the football field, with New Hampshire currently holding a 58–46–8 edge in the all-time series.

History
The winner of each year's game gets possession of an "antique fowling" musket, named after former head coaches of the two programs; Fred Brice who coached at Maine (1921–1940) and Butch Cowell who coached at New Hampshire (1915–1936). The musket was "donated by Portland alumni of the two institutions", and was first awarded to the winner of the 1948 game (New Hampshire). It is a flintlock with a  barrel in .65 caliber, made by Ebenezer Nutting of Falmouth, Maine, in the 1722–1745 era.

The teams have met annually since 1922 except for two seasons during World War II, and the 2020 season when New Hampshire ended their season after playing just one game due to impact from the COVID-19 pandemic in the United States.

Notable games
The Maine and New Hampshire football programs first met in 1903, when two games were played, both won by Maine.

The 1919 contest ended in controversy, with confusion over whether a New Hampshire trick play in the final minute of the game was a touchdown or a touchback. Days later, a board of officials ruled the play a touchback, giving Maine a 7–3 win.

In 1944, the teams met twice, with each team winning the game played on its home field. The 1944 Wildcats played a limited four-game schedule, with a roster consisting of 17-year-olds and returning veterans. The results of these two games are listed in Maine's media guide and College Football Data Warehouse, but have been absent from New Hampshire's media guide.

The 1993 game had the largest margin of victory, 50 points, as New Hampshire won, 63–13.

News reports around the 2012 game referred to it as the 100th meeting between the two programs. If the aforementioned 1944 games are included the all-time series, as is reflected in the below table, the 2012 game was actually the 102nd meeting between the teams.

The only season to feature two games between the teams—other than 1903 and 1944 as mentioned above—was 2013, with New Hampshire first winning the regular season contest, and then a rematch as part of the 2013 FCS playoff.

The Maine–New Hampshire contest scheduled for November 21, 2020, was not played, as New Hampshire announced the postponement of fall sports due to the COVID-19 pandemic on July 17, 2020. On October 27, 2020, the CAA announced a tentative football schedule for spring 2021, with New Hampshire and Maine scheduled to play in Orono on April 17, 2021. However, on April 6, following the cancelation of three games due to COVID issues, New Hampshire opted out of the remainder of the season. Following the resumption of the rivalry in 2021, Maine defeated New Hampshire on November 20, 33–20.

Game results

Note: The score of the first game between the teams, held on September 26, 1903, is listed as 18–0 in the New Hampshire football media guide, and in contemporary news reports of 1903; College Football Data Warehouse and the Maine football media guide list it as 10–0.

See also 
 List of NCAA college football rivalry games
 List of most-played college football series in NCAA Division I

References

College football rivalries in the United States
Maine Black Bears football
New Hampshire Wildcats football
1903 establishments in Maine
1903 establishments in New Hampshire